In the run up to the 1993 Spanish general election, various organisations carried out opinion polling to gauge voting intention in Spain during the term of the 4th Cortes Generales. Results of such polls are displayed in this article. The date range for these opinion polls is from the previous general election, held on 29 October 1989, to the day the next election was held, on 6 June 1993.

Voting intention estimates refer mainly to a hypothetical Congress of Deputies election. Polls are listed in reverse chronological order, showing the most recent first and using the dates when the survey fieldwork was done, as opposed to the date of publication. Where the fieldwork dates are unknown, the date of publication is given instead. The highest percentage figure in each polling survey is displayed with its background shaded in the leading party's colour. If a tie ensues, this is applied to the figures with the highest percentages. The "Lead" columns on the right shows the percentage-point difference between the parties with the highest percentages in a poll.

Nationwide polling

Graphical summary

Voting intention estimates
The table below lists nationwide voting intention estimates. Refusals are generally excluded from the party vote percentages, while question wording and the treatment of "don't know" responses and those not intending to vote may vary between polling organisations. When available, seat projections determined by the polling organisations are displayed below (or in place of) the percentages in a smaller font; 176 seats were required for an absolute majority in the Congress of Deputies.

Voting preferences
Polls shown below show the recording of raw responses for each party as a percentage of total responses before disregarding those who opted to abstain and prior to the adjusting for the likely votes of those who were undecided to obtain an estimate of vote share. The highest percentage figure in each polling survey is displayed in bold, and the background shaded in the leading party's colour. In the instance that there is a tie, then no figure is shaded.

Notes

References

1993
1993 elections in Spain